Sal-like 1 (Drosophila), also known as SALL1, is a protein which in humans is encoded by the SALL1 gene. As the full name suggests, it is one of the human versions of the spalt (sal) gene known in Drosophila.

Function 

The protein encoded by this gene is a zinc finger transcriptional repressor and may be part of the NuRD histone deacetylase (HDAC) complex.

Clinical significance 

Defects in this gene are a cause of Townes–Brocks syndrome (TBS) as well as branchio-oto-renal syndrome (BOR). Two transcript variants encoding different isoforms have been found for this gene.

Interactions 

SALL1 has been shown to interact with TERF1 and UBE2I.

References

External links 
  GeneReviews/NCBI/NIH/UW entry on Townes-Brocks Syndrome

Further reading 

 
 
 
 
 
 
 
 
 
 
 
 
 
 
 
 
 
 
 

Transcription factors